Sarah Malcolm ( – early March 1733) was a British murderer who was sketched by William Hogarth as she awaited execution for a multiple murder.

Life
Malcolm came from an Anglo–Irish family in County Durham, where she was born around 1710. She was brought up in Dublin. She came to London and found work in domestic service, working as a laundress for residents above the Inns of the Court. She came to know an old lady named Lydia Duncomb (aged about 80). Duncomb lived with two maids: Elizabeth Harrison (aged about 60), who was infirm; and Ann Price (aged about 17). In February 1733 the three women were found murdered and their apartment burgled, and Malcolm was brought in for questioning. 

Malcolm confessed to being involved in the robbery (itself a capital crime), but said that she was part of a group of four. If she could have implicated the other three for the murders then she might still have escaped a death sentence, but the investigators were not convinced. The key evidence was that her clothing had blood stains (Malcolm claimed this was simply her own menstrual blood rather than the blood of the victims) and that 45 guineas were found hidden in her hair. During the trial she defended herself, and Jane Magreth considers that her defence was "convincing" and "at least worthy of consideration". Arthur Griffiths, military historian, author and prison administrator states that she was an "unsexed desparado", her murders of "particular atrocity even in those bloodthirsty times". Malcolm was sentenced to be hanged after the jury took 15 minutes to decide her guilt. Hanged at Tyburn in London in early March 1733, still denying the killing, she is remembered because William Hogarth visited her in Newgate Prison a few days before she was executed and sketched her and later arranged for both an engraving and later an oil painting to be made of her. Hogarth was not alone in exploiting her notoriety as others went to see if they could gain a confession that they could publish.

References

External links
 

1733 deaths
People from Durham, England
British female murderers
Year of birth missing
English people convicted of murder
People convicted of murder by England and Wales
People executed for murder
People executed by the Kingdom of Great Britain
Executed British people
People executed by England and Wales by hanging
Executed English women